Thomas Koonce Sanders, Sr. (July 21, 1932 – December 11, 2011) was an American bridge player from Nashville, Tennessee. He was married to Carol Sanders, a women's teams world champion player.

Sanders was a graduate of Vanderbilt University. He won a single World Bridge Federation gold medal as USA  in the 1981 Bermuda Bowl tournament.

Tom and Carol Sanders were both inducted into the ACBL Hall of Fame in 2002. They were recipients of the von Zedtwitz Award; that is, were nominated for the Hall of Fame by a "Veterans Committee" of players out of the limelight for some time.

Bridge accomplishments

Honors

 ACBL Hall of Fame, von Zedtwitz Award 2002

Wins

 North American Bridge Championships (12)
 von Zedtwitz Life Master Pairs (1) 1982 
 Blue Ribbon Pairs (1) 1977 
 Hilliard Mixed Pairs (1) 1961 
 Vanderbilt (3) 1979, 1990, 1993 
 Senior Knockout Teams (3) 1995, 1996, 1998 
 Mitchell Board-a-Match Teams (1) 1983 
 Chicago Mixed Board-a-Match (1) 1982 
 Spingold (1) 1977

Runners-up

 North American Bridge Championships
 Rockwell Mixed Pairs (1) 1979 
 Silodor Open Pairs (1) 1960 
 Wernher Open Pairs (1) 1963 
 Vanderbilt (2) 1978, 1985 
 Keohane North American Swiss Teams (1) 1982 
 Reisinger (3) 1961, 1973, 1986 
 Spingold (1) 1963

References

External links
 
 

1932 births
2011 deaths
American contract bridge players
Vanderbilt University alumni
People from Nashville, Tennessee